The Canadian Open is a professional golf tournament in Canada. It is co-organized by Golf Canada (formerly known as the Royal Canadian Golf Association) and the PGA Tour. It was first played  in 1904, and has been held annually since then, except for during World War I, World War II and the COVID-19 pandemic. It is the third oldest continuously running tournament on the tour, after The Open Championship and the U.S. Open. It is the only national championship that is a PGA Tour-managed event.

Tournament
As a national open, and especially as the most accessible non-U.S. national open for American golfers, the event had a special status in the era before the professional tour system became dominant in golf. In the interwar years, it was sometimes considered the third most prestigious tournament in the sport, after The Open Championship and the U.S. Open. This previous status was noted in the media in 2000, when Tiger Woods became the first man to win The Triple Crown (all three Opens in the same season) in 29 years, since Lee Trevino in 1971. In the decades preceding the tournament's move to an undesirable September date in 1988, the Canadian Open was often unofficially referred to as the fifth major.

The top three golfers on the PGA Tour Canada Order of Merit prior to the tournament are given entry into the Canadian Open. However, prize money won at the Canadian Open does not count towards the Canadian Tour money list.

Celebrated winners include Hall of Fame members Leo Diegel, Walter Hagen, Tommy Armour, Harry Cooper, Lawson Little, Sam Snead, Craig Wood, Byron Nelson, Doug Ford, Bobby Locke, Bob Charles, Arnold Palmer, Kel Nagle, Billy Casper, Gene Littler, Lee Trevino, Curtis Strange, Greg Norman, Nick Price, Vijay Singh, and Mark O'Meara. The Canadian Open is regarded as the most prestigious tournament never won by Jack Nicklaus, a seven-time runner-up. Diegel has the most titles, with four in the 1920s.

In the early 2000s, the tournament was still being held in early September. Seeking to change back to a more desirable summer date in the schedule, the RCGA lobbied for a better date. When the PGA Tour's schedule was revamped to accommodate the FedEx Cup in 2007, the Canadian Open was rescheduled for late July, sandwiched between three events with even higher profiles (The Open Championship the week prior, the WGC-Bridgestone Invitational the week after, and the PGA Championship the week after that). The tournament counts towards the FedEx Cup standings, and earns the winner a Masters invitation.

In 2019, due to a re-alignment of the PGA Tour and major scheduling, the Canadian Open moved to early-June prior to the U.S. Open. The event was also added to the Open Qualifying Series, allowing up to three of the top-ten finishers to qualify for the Open Championship.

The 2020 event, originally scheduled for June 11 to 14 at St. George's Golf and Country Club in Toronto, was cancelled because of the COVID-19 pandemic.  On March 9, 2021, Golf Canada announced that the 2021 tournament would be cancelled as well.

Courses
Glen Abbey Golf Course has hosted the most Canadian Opens, with 30 to date. Glen Abbey was designed in 1976 by Jack Nicklaus for the Royal Canadian Golf Association, to serve as the permanent home for the championship.

In the mid-1990s, the RCGA decided to move the championship around the country. The owner of Glen Abbey since 2005, Clublink Corp filed an application in October 2015 to redevelop the property into a residential community, with offices and retail stores. There was no provision for a golf course in the plan. The Town of Oakville Council responded in August 2017 by declaring the golf course a heritage site under the Ontario Heritage Act, which would make it more difficult for ClubLink to develop the area as it had planned. Golf Canada was also concerned since it could not predict whether it could get the necessary permit to hold the Canadian Open at Glen Abbey in 2018 as it had planned. The dispute between the Town of Oakville and ClubLink remains before the courts as of November 2018. The 2019 and 2023 Open will be held at Hamilton Golf and Country Club. The event may again be held at Glen Abbey in some future years if the planned redevelopment by Clublink is not allowed to proceed.

Royal Montreal Golf Club, home of the first Open in 1904, ranks second having hosted the event ten times. Mississaugua Golf & Country Club and Hamilton Golf and Country Club have each hosted six Opens while Toronto Golf Club and St. George's Golf and Country Club have hosted five Opens. Three clubs have each hosted four Opens: Lambton Golf Club, Shaughnessy Golf & Country Club, and Scarboro Golf and Country Club.

The championship has for the most part been held in Ontario and Quebec, between them having seen all but nine Opens. New Brunswick had the Open in 1939, Manitoba in 1952 and 1961, Alberta in 1958, and British Columbia in 1948, 1954, 1966, 2005 and 2011.

The 2002 event was held on the south course at Angus Glen Golf Club, while the 2007 event was held on the north course.

History

The Royal Montreal Golf Club, founded in 1873, is the oldest continuously running official golf club in North America. The club was the host of the first Canadian Open championship in 1904, and has been host to nine other Canadian Opens, at two locations, with the club moving to its current site on an island west of Montreal in 1959. The 1912 Canadian Open at the Rosedale Golf Club was famed American golfer Walter Hagen's first professional competition. In 1914, Karl Keffer won the event, being the last Canadian-born champion.

Englishman J. Douglas Edgar captured the 1919 championship at Hamilton Golf and Country Club by a record 16-stroke margin; 17-year-old amateur prodigy Bobby Jones (who was coached by Edgar) tied for second. The 1930 Canadian Open at Hamilton was another stellar tournament. Tommy Armour blazed his way around the course over the final 18 holes of regulation play, shooting a 64. Four-time champion Diegel and Armour went to a 36-hole playoff to decide the title. Armour shot 138 (69-69) to defeat Diegel by three strokes.

Toronto's St. Andrews Golf Club hosted the Open in 1936 and 1937 – the only course to hold back-to-back Opens until the creation of Glen Abbey – before it felt the impact of the growth of the city, and was ploughed under to allow for the creation of Highway 401. The Riverside Golf and Country Club of Rothesay, New Brunswick was host to the 1939 Canadian Open where Harold "Jug" McSpaden was champion. This was the only time the Open has been held in Atlantic Canada.

Scarboro Golf and Country Club in eastern Toronto was host to four Canadian Opens: 1940, 1947, 1953, and 1963. Three of these events were decided by one stroke, and the only time the margin was two shots was when Bobby Locke defeated Ed Oliver in 1947. With his win at Scarboro in 1947, the golfer from South Africa became just the second non-North American winner of the Canadian Open. Locke fired four rounds in the 60s to finish at 16-under-par, two strokes better than the American Oliver. After the prize presentation Locke was given a standing ovation, and was then hoisted to shoulders by fellow countrymen who were then residents of Canada.

In 1948, for the first time, the Canadian Open traveled west of Ontario, landing at Shaughnessy Heights Golf Club in Vancouver, British Columbia, where Charles Congdon sealed his victory on the 16th hole with a 150-yard bunker shot that stopped eight feet from the cup. The following birdie gave him the lead, and Congdon went on to win by three shots.

Mississaugua Golf & Country Club has hosted six Canadian Opens: 1931, 1938, 1942, 1951, 1965, and 1974. The 1951 Open tournament was won by Jim Ferrier, who successfully defended the title he had won at Royal Montreal a year earlier. Winnipeg's St. Charles Country Club hosted the 1952 Canadian Open, and saw Johnny Palmer set the 72-hole scoring record of 263, which still stands after more than 60 years. Palmer's rounds of 66-65-66-66 bettered the old 1947 mark set by Bobby Locke by five shots. In 1955, Arnold Palmer captured the Canadian Open championship, his first PGA Tour victory, at the Weston Golf and Country Club.

Montreal, Quebec's Laval-sur-le-Lac hosted the 1962 Open where Gary Player was disqualified after the first round, when he recorded the wrong score on the 10th hole. He had won the PGA Championship the week before. Californian Charlie Sifford attended the 1962 Canadian Open in part to raise the profile of African-American players on the PGA Tour. He was one of only 16 of the top 100 players on tour to play there in 1962.

Pinegrove Country Club played host to the Canadian Open in 1964 and 1969. Australian Kel Nagle edged Arnold Palmer and Raymond Floyd at the 1964 Open to become, aged almost 44 at the time, the oldest player to win the title. Five years later, Tommy Aaron fired a final-round 64 to force a playoff with 57-year-old Sam Snead. Aaron won the 18-hole playoff, beating Snead by two strokes (70-72).

The small town of Ridgeway, Ontario in the Niagara Peninsula was host of the 1972 Open at Cherry Hill Golf Club. A popular choice of venue, it drew rave reviews by the players, specifically the 1972 champion Gay Brewer, who called it the best course he had ever played in Canada, and Arnold Palmer, who suggested the Open be held there again the following year. In 1975, Tom Weiskopf won his second Open in three years in dramatic fashion at the Blue Course of Royal Montreal's new venue, defeating Jack Nicklaus on the first hole of a sudden-death playoff, after almost holing his short-iron approach. Windsor, Ontario's Essex Golf & Country Club was host of the 1976 Canadian Open, where Nicklaus again finished second, this time behind champion Jerry Pate. Essex came to the rescue late in the game, when it was determined that the newly built Glen Abbey was not yet ready to host the Canadian Open. The 1997 Open at Royal Montreal was the first time Tiger Woods ever missed a professional cut, after winning the Masters Tournament a few months before.

Angus Glen Golf Club was host to two recent Canadian Opens, 2002 and 2007. In 2007 Jim Furyk became one of a few golfers who have won two consecutive Canadian Open titles, joining James Douglas Edgar, Leo Diegel, Sam Snead and Jim Ferrier. Angus Glen owns the unique distinction of having each of its two courses (North and South) host the Canadian Open.

Glen Abbey Golf Club of Oakville, Ontario has hosted 30 Open Championships (1977–79, 1981–96, 1998–2000, 2004, 2008–09, 2013, 2015–2018), and has crowned 24 different champions. The 11th hole at Glen Abbey is widely considered its signature hole, and begins the world-famous valley sequence of five holes from 11 to 15. The picturesque 11th is a 459-yard straightaway par-4, where players tee off 100 feet above the fairway, which ends at Sixteen Mile Creek, just short of the green. John Daly left his mark, and a plaque is permanently displayed on the back tee deck, recounting Daly's attempt to reach the green with his tee shot. His ball landed in the creek.

In 2000, Tiger Woods dueled with Grant Waite over the final 18 holes, before finally subduing the New Zealander on the 72nd hole with an exceptional shot. Holding a one-shot advantage, Woods found his tee shot in a fairway bunker, and after watching Waite put his second shot 30 feet from the hole, decided to go for the green. Woods hit a 6-iron which carried a lake and settled on the fringe just past the flag, which was 218 yards away, and then chipped to tap-in range for the title-clinching birdie. With the victory, Woods became only the second golfer to capture the U.S. Open, Open Championship and Canadian Open in the same year, earning him the Triple Crown trophy; he matched Lee Trevino (1971).

In 2009, Mark Calcavecchia scored nine consecutive birdies at the second round, breaking the PGA Tour record.

Canadian performances
A Canadian has not won the Canadian Open since Pat Fletcher in 1954. One of the most exciting conclusions ever seen at the Open came in 2004, extending that streak. Mike Weir had never done well at the Glen Abbey Golf Course, the site of the tournament that week. In fact, he had only made the cut once at any of the Opens contested at Glen Abbey. But Weir clawed his way to the top of the leaderboard by Friday. And by the third day at the 100th anniversary Open, he had a three-stroke lead, and many Canadians were buzzing about the possibility of the streak's end. Weir started off with a double bogey, but then went 4-under to keep his 3-stroke lead, with only eight holes left. Yet, with the expectations of Canadian observers abnormally high, there was another roadblock in the way of Mike Weir: Vijay Singh. Weir bogeyed three holes on the back nine but still had a chance to win the tournament with a 10-footer on the 72nd hole. When he missed the putt, the two entered a sudden-death playoff. Weir missed two more chances to win the tournament: a 25-foot putt for eagle on No. 18 on the first hole of sudden-death, and a 5-foot putt on No. 17, the second playoff hole. On the third playoff hole, Weir put his third shot into the water after a horrid drive and lay-up, and Singh was safely on the green in two. Singh won the Open and overtook Tiger Woods as the world's number one player.

Canadian David Hearn took a two-shot lead into the final round in 2015. He still had the lead as late as the 15th hole, but was being closely pursued by three players ranked near the top of the Official World Golf Ranking – Bubba Watson, Jim Furyk, and Jason Day. All four golfers had chances to win right until the end. Hearn was overtaken by champion Day's three consecutive birdies to close the round; Day finished one shot ahead of Watson, who also birdied the final three holes, narrowly missing an eagle attempt on a final hole greenside chip that would have tied. Day's fourth career Tour triumph came after he had just missed a potential tying putt on the final hole at the Open Championship the previous week. Hearn finished third, the best result by a Canadian since Weir's near-miss in 2004. In 2016, Canadian amateur Jared du Toit was only one stroke behind going into the final round, allowing him to play in the final group. He finished tied for ninth, three strokes behind eventual winner Jhonattan Vegas.

Event titles

Winners

Note: Green highlight indicates scoring records.
Source

Multiple and consecutive champions
This table lists the golfers who have won more than one Canadian Open.

Champions by nationality
This table lists the total number of titles won by golfers of each nationality.

Trophies
The first trophy presented to the winner was donated by the Rivermead Golf Club who hosted the event in 1920. Before then the winner received a gold medal. The following trophies have been used since 1920:
 The Rivermead Challenge Cup 1920–1935
 The Seagram Gold Cup 1936–1970
 The Du Maurier Trophy 1971–1993
 The RBC Canadian Open Trophy 1994–present

Between 1936 and 1961 and since 2007, the Rivermead Challenge Cup has been presented to the Canadian professional with the lowest score.

Future sites

Source:

See also
 Triple Crown of Golf

References

External links
 
 Coverage on the PGA Tour's official site

 
PGA Tour events
Golf tournaments in Canada
Royal Bank of Canada
1904 establishments in Ontario
Recurring sporting events established in 1904